The first season of The Fugitive premiered on September 17, 1963. It aired Tuesdays at 10:00-11:00 pm on ABC from September 17, 1963 to April 21, 1964. The season was released through two volumes on Region 1 DVDs, with the first volume (containing the first 15 episodes) being released on August 14, 2007 and Volume 2 being released on February 26, 2008.

Episodes

References

The Fugitive (TV series) seasons